is a Japanese historical drama television series starring Jun Matsumoto as Tokugawa Ieyasu. The series is the 62nd NHK taiga drama.

Cast

Starring role
Jun Matsumoto as Tokugawa Ieyasu
Waku Kawaguchi as Takechiyo (young Ieyasu)

Tokugawa clan
Kasumi Arimura as Sena, Ieyasu's first wife
Nanako Matsushima as Odai no Kata, Ieyasu's mother
Kisuke Iida as Matsudaira Hirotada, Ieyasu's father
Alice Hirose as Lady Oai
Kanata Hosoda as Matsudaira Nobuyasu
Mahoro Terajima as Takechiyo (young Nobuyasu)
Shiori Kubo (Nogizaka46) as Gotoku
Ami Touma as Kamehime
Nao Ōmori as Sakai Tadatsugu
Yutaka Matsushige as Ishikawa Kazumasa
Yuki Yamada as Honda Tadakatsu
Kenichi Matsuyama as Honda Masanobu
Yosuke Sugino as Sakakibara Yasumasa
Rihito Itagaki as Ii Naomasa
Issey Ogata as Torii Tadayoshi
Takuma Oto'o as Torii Mototada
Shinya Kote as Ōkubo Tadayo
Dai Okabe (Hanako) as Hiraiwa Chikayoshi
Takayuki Yamada as Hattori Hanzō
Masahiro Kōmoto as Natsume Yoshinobu
Kazuki Namioka as Honda Tadazane
Subaru Kimura as Watanabe Moritsuna
Tetsuya Chiba as Ōnezumi
Marika Matsumoto as Onna-ōnezumi
Kazuo Kawabata as Anaguma
Tsubaki Nekoze as Toyo
Kana Kita as Oyō
Shuri Nakamura as Miyo
Rena Matsui as Oman
Katsuya Maiguma as Ōoka Yashirō
Kenta Nitta as Ban Yoshichirō

Imagawa clan
Mansai Nomura as Imagawa Yoshimoto
Junpei Mizobata as Imagawa Ujizane
Mirai Shida as Ito
Atsuro Watabe as Sekiguchi Ujizumi
Miki Maya as Tomoe
Hana Toyoshima as Tane
Nagisa Sekimizu as Otazu
Gōta Watabe as Iio Tsuratatsu
Tōru Nomaguchi as Udono Nagateru
Uta Yorikawa as Udono Ujinaga
Sera Ishida as Udono Ujitsugu
Hiroyuki Amano as Yamada Shin'emon
Kenichi Yajima as Kira Yoshiakira
Miō Tanaka as Okabe Motonobu

Oda clan
Junichi Okada as Oda Nobunaga
Hiroshi Fujioka as Oda Nobuhide, Nobunaga's father
Keiko Kitagawa as Oichi
Yūwa Kamimura as young Oichi
Yoshi Sakou as Akechi Mitsuhide
Mitsuo Yoshihara as Shibata Katsuie
Tatekawa Danshun as Sakuma Nobumori

Toyotomi clan
Tsuyoshi Muro as Toyotomi Hideyoshi

Takeda clan
Hiroshi Abe as Takeda Shingen
Gordon Maeda as Takeda Katsuyori
Satoshi Hashimoto as Yamagata Masakage
Seiichi Tanabe as Anayama Baisetsu

Azai clan
Yūsuke Ōnuki as Azai Nagamasa
Aoi Itō as Azuki

Ashikaga shogunate
Arata Furuta as Ashikaga Yoshiaki

Others
Kōtarō Satomi as Tōyo-shōnin
Ichikawa Udanji III as Kūsei-shōnin 
Susumu Terajima as Mizuno Nobumoto
Lily Franky as Hisamatsu Toshikatsu
Kento Nagao (Naniwa Danshi) as Hisamatsu Katsutoshi
Akihiro Kakuta (Tokyo 03) as Matsudaira Masahisa
Kotone Furukawa as Chiyo, a Miko
Nakamura Kankurō VI as Chaya Shirōjirō Kiyonobu
Jin Shirasu as Okudaira Nobumasa
Taiiku Okazaki as Torii Suneemon
Manami Igashira as Otama
Ai Tenshō as Ofū
Amane Tenshō as Orin

TV schedule

References

External links
Official website 

2023 Japanese television series debuts
Taiga drama
Cultural depictions of Akechi Mitsuhide
Cultural depictions of Hattori Hanzō
Cultural depictions of Oda Nobunaga
Cultural depictions of Sanada clan
Cultural depictions of Takeda Shingen
Cultural depictions of Tokugawa Ieyasu
Cultural depictions of Toyotomi Hideyoshi
Television series set in the 16th century
Television series set in the 17th century